Red Mango FC, LLC is an American frozen yogurt and smoothie brand known for its all-natural frozen yogurt, fresh fruit smoothies, yogurt parfaits, and fresh juices. There are now more than 50 locations in over 15 states in the United States and Puerto Rico, and one each in El Salvador and Qatar. In 2011, Red Mango was named the No. 1 Zagat Rated chain in America for smoothies and frozen yogurt.

Background
Daniel J. Kim, the company's founder, graduated from UC Berkeley’s Haas School of Business in 1998, and first worked as an investment banker with Donaldson, Lufkin & Jenrette. 

According to the company website, Red Mango gets its name because “the mango, distinctly delicious and high in nutrition, becomes red at its optimal stage of ripeness.”

Expansion
The first store was opened in 2007 in Los Angeles near UCLA. After opening their first store in California, Red Mango opened stores in Nevada, Utah, Washington, and New York. One year after the first store opened in Los Angeles, Red Mango opened 30 new stores. In 2008, Taco Bell executive John Antioco stepped down and became an adviser for Red Mango, this helped the brand grow to 20 stores by April 2008. By the end of 2009, Red Mango had 60 stores in operation.

In the summer of 2010, Red Mango added 22 varieties of smoothies to their menu. By the end of 2010, Red Mango awarded agreements for 147 locations and opened 62 new stores, bringing the total number of locations to 100. They were named #4 on Restaurant Business Magazines “Future 50” list of the fastest-growing chains in 2010.

In May 2012, the Dallas-based company entered into an agreement with Mexican theater chain Cinemex to introduce Red Mango products to Mexico.

They open many of their stores on or near college campuses. In 2010, about 70% of Red Mango’s buyers were women.

Red Mango also has 7 stores in the Philippines. 1 in Makati, 1 in Manila, 4 in Quezon City and 1 in San Juan, Metro Manila.

Products

Red Mango uses all-natural, nonfat & lowfat kosher frozen yogurt fortified with probiotics. They were the first frozen yogurt store to be certified by the National Yogurt Association with the Live & Active Cultures seal, indicating the use of real yogurt. As of July 2008, the company's lineup of frozen yogurt flavors consisted of Original, Pomegranate, Madagascar Vanilla, and a rotating variety of seasonal or specialty flavors. These include Green Tea, Mango, Banana, Nutty Potion, and Peanut Butter.

Red Mango’s frozen yogurt is topped with fruits (such as blueberries, mango, pineapple, and strawberries) and/or “fun and crunchy” items (such as almonds, graham cracker, organic granola, and mochi).

Management
The company's investors and advisors include John Antioco (former CEO and Chairman of Blockbuster Inc., Taco Bell, and Circle K Convenience Stores).  The company, which currently has offices in Dallas, Texas and New York, New York, raised $12 million in private equity financing in August 2008 and moved its headquarters from Sherman Oaks, CA to Dallas in early May 2009.

See also
 List of frozen dessert brands

References

External links
 

American subsidiaries of foreign companies
Brand name frozen desserts
Companies based in Dallas
Fast-food chains of the United States
Frozen yogurt businesses
Regional restaurant chains in the United States
Restaurants established in 2002